Barilius lairokensis is a fish in genus Barilius of the family Cyprinidae.

References 

L
Fish described in 2000